Alexander Gordon Culbert Ramsay (10 October 1863 – 2 August 1925) was an Australian politician, who served in the Victorian Legislative Assembly.

Ramsay was born in Williamstown, Victoria to Scottish-born engineer Alexander Culbert Ramsay and Mary Jane Whan. He worked as a mechanical engineer in Western Australia before returning to Victoria to work for the Vacuum Oil Company. He later served as chairman of an oil company Ramsay and Treganowan, and as a sergeant in the Williamstown Artillery Battery. Around 1886 he married Florence Louisa Blyth.

In 1900 Ramsay was elected to the Victorian Legislative Assembly as the Liberal member for Williamstown, serving two terms until his defeat at the 1904 election. He was also President of the Williamstown Football Club from 1903-06 and a Vice-President in 1907-08. Ramsay died in 1925 at Williamstown.

References

1863 births
1925 deaths
Members of the Victorian Legislative Assembly
People from Williamstown, Victoria
Australian engineers
Australian businesspeople